Dalma island is an Emirati island located in the Persian Gulf approximately  off the coast of Abu Dhabi The island is served by the Dalma Airport  and by a mainland ferry. The island has multiple fresh water wells, which made human settlement possible historically. It has a population of approximately 5000 in the 2000 census.

History
The Abu Dhabi Islands Archaeological Survey (ADIAS) carried out an initial archaeological survey of Dalma island in 1992. A total of more than 20 archaeological sites were identified on the island, ranging in time from the Neolithic (Late Stone Age).

References

Islands of the Emirate of Abu Dhabi
Western Region, Abu Dhabi